Gilkicker Lagoon is a Site of Special Scientific Interest (SSSI) in Gosport, Hampshire, England. The SSSI covers 4.07 hectares.

There are five species of rare mollusc at the Lagoon.

References 

Gosport
Sites of Special Scientific Interest in Hampshire
Sites of Special Scientific Interest notified in 1984